The Jacksonville Dolphins men's lacrosse team is a college lacrosse team that represents Jacksonville University in Jacksonville, Florida, United States. As of the upcoming 2023 season, the Dolphins compete in JU's full-time home of the ASUN Conference. The men's lacrosse team had been an associate member of the Southern Conference (SoCon) in the 2022 season under the terms of an agreement between the ASUN and SoCon made when the ASUN relaunched its men's lacrosse league in that season. However, a conference realignment triggered by the Atlantic 10 Conference's announcement that it would sponsor men's lacrosse starting in the 2023 season led to the SoCon dropping the sport. Following the 2022 season, Jacksonville returned men's lacrosse to the ASUN.

History

Conference affiliations
 Independent (2010)
 Metro Atlantic Athletic Conference (2011–2012)
 ASUN (2013–2014)
 SoCon (2015–2022)
 ASUN (2023–present)

Year by year results

All-time coaching records

Footnotes

References

External links
 Official website

College men's lacrosse teams in the United States
ASUN Conference men's lacrosse